Christine Westermann (born 2 December 1948 in Erfurt) is a German television and radio host, journalist and author.

Radio and television career 
Westermann grew up in Mannheim. In 1983 she switched to WDR and moderated the  until 2002, from 1987 on together with Frank Plasberg.

Since 1996 Westermann has been moderating the show  together with Götz Alsmann, in which an alternating famous  "roommate" will be challenged with unusual tasks and games. Westermann and Alsmann called the format a "children's birthday party for celebrities". For their work with Zimmer frei! the duo has been awarded with the Adolf-Grimme-Preis in 2000.

Westermann also works as a host for the German radio station WDR 2, where she presents – rotating with her colleagues – the Montalk (Monday talk) and on Sundays the Buchtipp (Book tip). In 2010 she was awarded with the German Radio prize in the category Best Interview.

Writer 
In 1999 Christine Westermann published her first book Baby, when will you marry me? – A novel from the jungle of relationships (German title: Baby, wann heiratest du mich?). One year later her second book I think he dropped (me). Stories out of the real life (German: Ich glaube, er hat Schluss gemacht. Geschichten aus dem richtigen Leben) followed. In collaboration with  she published the 2008 book Invitation for dance – a twosome story (German: Aufforderung zum Tanz – Eine Zweiergeschichte), a correspondence between two journalists.

Personal life 
Between 1990 and 2000 Westermann had a secondary residence in San Francisco, where she worked as a freelance correspondent. During that time she shuttled regularly between the US and her workplace in Cologne. Since June 2000 Westermann has been married to corporate consultant Jochen Baller, who is also her agent. They live in Cologne.

Novels 
 Baby, wann heiratest du mich?, Kiepenheuer und Witsch, Köln 1999,  (1999)
 Ich glaube, er hat Schluss gemacht, Kiepenheuer und Witsch, Köln 2000,  (2000)
 Aufforderung zum Tanz (2008), Kiepenheuer und Witsch, Köln 2008,  (2009) – in collaboration with Jörg Thadeusz
 Karneval. Bilder und Geschichten, Kiepenheuer & Witsch, Köln 2009,  (2009) – in collaboration with Stefan Worring
 Da geht noch was: Mit 65 in die Kurve, Kiepenheuer & Witsch, Köln 2013,  (2013).

External links 

 
 Official website by Christine Westermann (German)
 Christine Westermann at WDR 2 radio station (German)
 Planet Interview: "Über die wirklich wichtigen Dinge wird nicht gesprochen" – Christine Westermann and Jörg Thadeusz in an interview with Christian Rohm (7 December 2008)

1948 births
Living people
German television presenters
German television journalists
German women television journalists
German radio presenters
20th-century German journalists
21st-century German journalists
German-language writers
German women radio presenters
German women television presenters
ZDF people
Westdeutscher Rundfunk people
20th-century German women
21st-century German women